Ofri Lankri (born 6 July 1991) is a retired Israeli tennis player. Playing for Israel Fed Cup team, she has a win–loss record of 1–1.

ITF finals

Singles: 8 (2–6)

Doubles: 4 (3–1)

ITF junior finals

Singles (0–3)

Doubles (0–1)

National representation

Fed Cup
Lankri made her Fed Cup debut for Israel in 2014, while the team was competing in the Europe/Africa Zone Group I.

Fed Cup (1–1)

Singles (1–0)

Doubles (0–1)

See also
Jews in Sports#Tennis

References

External links
 
 
 

1991 births
Living people
Israeli female tennis players
Israeli Sephardi Jews
Israeli Mizrahi Jews
21st-century Israeli women